, nicknamed "Fisherman", is a former Nippon Professional Baseball outfielder and the current coach of the Yokohama DeNA BayStars.

References

External links

1969 births
Living people
Chiba Lotte Marines players
Japanese baseball coaches
Japanese baseball players
Lotte Orions players
Nippon Professional Baseball coaches
Nippon Professional Baseball outfielders
Baseball people from Hokkaido